Clyde Edgerton (born May 20, 1944) is an American author. He has published a dozen books, most of them novels, two of which have been adapted for film. He is also a professor, teaching creative writing.

Biography

Edgerton was born in Durham, North Carolina and grew up in the small town of Bethesda, North Carolina. He was the only child of Truma and Ernest Edgerton, who came from families of cotton and tobacco farmers, respectively. In 1962 Edgerton enrolled at the University of North Carolina at Chapel Hill, eventually majoring in English.  During this time he was a student in the Air Force ROTC program where he learned to fly a small plane.  After graduating in 1966, he entered the Air Force and served five years as a fighter pilot in the United States, Korea, Japan, and Thailand.

After his time in service, Edgerton got his Master's degree in English and began a job as an English teacher at his old high school. Soon after, he also earned a doctorate.

He decided to become a writer in 1978 after watching Eudora Welty read a short story on public television.

Publication of Edgerton's first novel, Raney, the plot of which revolves around the marriage of a Free Will Baptist and an Episcopalian, ultimately led to Edgerton's leaving the teaching staff at Campbell University in Buies Creek, North Carolina (a Baptist institution).  His later work, Killer Diller, is a thinly veiled satire of that university and its administration, with whom Edgerton clashed over Raney.

His novel Redeye was inspired by a visit to the Mesa Verde and Anasazi cliff dwellings; the book is a historical novel set in 1890s Colorado. His tenth novel, Night Train, follows two friends—one White and one Black—in the segregated South of the 1960s.

 he was a professor at the University of North Carolina Wilmington. He has a street named after him in Kernersville, North Carolina.

Works
Raney (1985)
Walking Across Egypt (1987)
The Floatplane Notebooks (1988)
Killer Diller (1991)
In Memory of Junior (1992)
Redeye (1995)
Where Trouble Sleeps (1997)
Lunch at the Piccadilly (2003)
Solo: My Adventure in the Air (2005; non-fiction memoir of his fighter pilot career)
The Bible Salesman (2008)
The Night Train (2011)
Papadaddy's Book for New Fathers: Advice to Dads of All Ages (2013)

Films
Two of Clyde Edgerton's novels have been adapted to film:
Walking Across Egypt, a 1999 film starring Jonathan Taylor Thomas
Killer Diller, a 2004 limited release film starring Lucas Black, in which Edgerton had a cameo as a faculty member.

Awards
Five 'notable books of the year' awards from The New York Times
Guggenheim Fellowship
Lyndhurst Fellowship
North Carolina Award for Literature
membership into the Fellowship of Southern Writers

References

External links

Biography
Clyde Edgerton Papers, 1918-2004 at the Wilson Library at the University of North Carolina at Chapel Hill

1944 births
Living people
20th-century American novelists
Writers from Durham, North Carolina
United States Air Force airmen
University of North Carolina at Chapel Hill alumni
American academics of English literature
21st-century American novelists
American male novelists
Writers of American Southern literature
20th-century American male writers
21st-century American male writers
Novelists from North Carolina
20th-century American non-fiction writers
21st-century American non-fiction writers
American male non-fiction writers